

Lincoln Electric Holdings, Inc. is an American multinational and global manufacturer of welding products, arc welding equipment, welding consumables, plasma and oxy-fuel cutting equipment and robotic welding systems.

The company is headquartered in Euclid, Ohio, United States and has a worldwide network of distributors and sales offices covering more than 160 countries. It has 42 manufacturing locations in North America, Europe, Middle East, Asia and Latin America. It also operates manufacturing alliances and joint ventures in 19 countries. It is a member of the Fortune 1000.

The company reported over $2.9 billion sales in 2013, with sales from North America accounting for 50% of it. Lincoln has over 8,500 employees globally with around 3,000 of those in the United States. Among Lincoln's Electric subsidiaries is the Harris Products Group, which is a manufacturer of welding consumables, gas apparatus, and other specialty products. The Harris Products Group has manufacturing facilities in Georgia, Ohio, California, Poland, Mexico, Brazil and Italy.

The company was founded in 1895 by John C. Lincoln with a capital investment of $200 to make electric motors he had designed.

Lincoln Electric has guaranteed employment with hours cut during hard times and overtime required during good times.

Locations 
Headquartered in Euclid, Ohio, Lincoln Electric has 44 manufacturing locations, including operations and joint ventures in 19 countries and a worldwide network of distributors and sales offices covering more than 160 countries.

Lincoln Foundation, Lincoln Institute of Land Policy, and Lincoln Welding School
The J.F. Lincoln Foundation is a non-profit, welding education organization founded in 1936 to promote welding as a better method of joining metals and to promote welding as a career choice. It is the only organization in the United States solely dedicated to educating the public about the art and science of arc welding. Formed when the arc welding industry was in its infancy, the Foundation publishes educational texts and grants cash awards to recognize technical achievements.

The Lincoln Institute of Land Policy was established by Lincoln Electric's founder, John C. Lincoln, in 1946, based on his admiration for the work of Henry George. Today, the think tank still focuses on promoting "creative approaches to land as a solution to economic, social, and environmental challenges."

The Lincoln Electric Welding School was set up in 1917, and has since instructed over 150,000 men and women in the various methods and techniques of safety and arc welding processes. The school is listed by the Ohio State Board of School and College Registration.

See also

 Arc welding

References

Further reading

External links
 

American companies established in 1895
Euclid, Ohio
Manufacturing companies established in 1895
1895 establishments in Ohio
Manufacturing companies based in Cleveland
Companies listed on the Nasdaq
Electric motor manufacturers